Christopher Nicholas Lynden Potter is a retired Anglican priest.

Potter was born on 4 October 1949, educated at Haileybury and the University of Leeds and ordained in 1993 after an earlier career as a furniture designer and cabinet maker. He began his ordained ministry as a curate in Flint, after which he was vicar of the grouped parishes of Llanfair DC, Llanelidan, Efenechtyd and Derwen, a post he held until his appointment as Dean of Asaph. He was Archdeacon of St Asaph from 2011 until 2014.

References

1969 births
People educated at Haileybury and Imperial Service College
Alumni of the University of Leeds
Archdeacons of St Asaph
Deans of St Asaph
Living people